George and the Big Bang is a 2011 children's book written by Stephen and Lucy Hawking. The book is the third book in the George series, following George's Secret Key to the Universe and George's Cosmic Treasure Hunt. George and the Big Bang is available in paperback, hardback and audio versions.

Plot
After coming back to the United Kingdom, George and Annie are trying to find the best place in the universe for Freddy the pig to live. They first look in the fictional Foxbridge University where Eric is a professor. Once there, they head up into a meeting of an anti-LHC group, which states that the theory of everything resists addition of gravity (TOERAG). Eric uses Cosmos, a supercomputer, to open a portal and takes Freddy to this unknown place.

The next day, George starts at the local high school, but returns to the university to find Eric in order to ask him where Freddy has gone. George discovers that Cosmos' portal is still open and wanders out on to the Moon to find Eric. Just before they leave, a Chinese satellite photographs them. However, since no one has supposedly set foot on the moon since 1972, this creates outrage among the Order of Science.

Eric's tutor, Zuzubin, calls a meeting of the Order of Science at CERN. Meanwhile, Dr. Reeper returns and activates his supercomputer Pooky so he can meet George in Andromeda via his electromechanical avatar. Dr. Reeper tells George that he has infiltrated TOERAG, the anti-LHC group. He also admits that he was forced to create a quantum mechanical bomb which cannot be defused easily, but luckily only has a probability to defuse if the right switch is activated. Dr. Reeper fails to pass on the complete information on how to deactivate the bomb, but he does tell George that the Order of Science has a traitor and that the meeting at the LHC is actually a plot to destroy all the scientists and the LHC using his bomb.

Meanwhile, Annie has got a new friend: Vincent, a karate black belt and the son of a film director.

See also 
 A Brief History of Time by Stephen Hawking
 Black Holes and Baby Universes and Other Essays by Stephen Hawking
 George's Secret Key to the Universe
 George's Cosmic Treasure Hunt
 George and the Unbreakable Code
 George and the Blue Moon
 Children's literature portal

References

External links

2011 children's books
2011 science fiction novels
Children's science fiction novels
British science fiction novels
British children's novels
Popular science books
Books by Stephen Hawking
2011 British novels
Doubleday (publisher) books